David Southard (1845 – May 6, 1894) was a Union Army soldier during the American Civil War who received America's highest military decoration the Medal of Honor for his actions at the Battle of Sailors Creek

Civil War Service
He enlisted in the 1st New Jersey Volunteer Cavalry in the summer of 1861, and was mustered in as a Private in the unit's Company C on August 17, 1861. He served in the field continuously through the next four years, re-enlisting on February 25, 1864. A combination of excellent field service combined with the attrition the war took on his Company, he rose in the later half of 1864, being promoted to Corporal on September 1, 1864, and to Sergeant on December 12, 1864. He took part in the Union cavalry operations in March and April 1865 that contributed to the surrender of the Army of Northern Virginia, performed post-war occupation duty, and was mustered out of service on July 24, 1865.

On April 6, 1865 he fought in the Battle of Sailor's Creek, Virginia. There in the midst of the battle he performed his act of bravery that would garner him the Medal of Honor, as his citation explains – "Capture of flag; and was the first man over the works in the charge". His Medal was awarded to him on July 3, 1865. Eleven other members of the 1st New Jersey Cavalry were also awarded the Medal of Honor for their bravery during the Civil War, making it the most decorated New Jersey Civil War regiment.

Later life
Sergeant Southard was one of four brothers who fought in the Civil War, all of whom survived the war. He retired to Ocean County, New Jersey, where he died in 1894. He is buried in the Zion Methodist Church Cemetery in New Egypt, New Jersey. His grave is marked with a government issue Medal of Honor gravestone.

Medal of Honor citation

Rank and Organization:
Sergeant, Company C, 1st New Jersey Cavalry. Place and date. At Sailors Creek, Va., April 6, 1865. Entered service at:------. Birth: Ocean County, N.J. Date of issue: July 3, 1865.

Citation:
Capture of flag; and was the first man over the works in the charge.

See also

 List of Medal of Honor recipients
 List of American Civil War Medal of Honor recipients: Q–S

Notes

References
 Bilby, Joseph G. and Goble, William C., "Remember You Are Jerseymen: A Military History of Jersey's Troops in the Civil War", Longstreet House, Hightstown, 1998. .
 Lang, George, Collins, Raymond L., and White, Gerald, Medal of Honor recipients 1863–1994, 1995 
 Stryker, William S., "Record of Officers and Men of New Jersey in the Civil War 1861-1865", Trenton, New Jersey, 1876.

Union Army soldiers
1845 births
1894 deaths
People of New Jersey in the American Civil War
United States Army Medal of Honor recipients
American Civil War recipients of the Medal of Honor
Burials in New Jersey